Prince Faisal bin Fahd League U-21, formerly Saudi Federation Cup/Prince Faisal bin Fahd Cup U-21/Prince Faisal bin Fahd Cup and currently known as Prince Faisal Bin Fahad Cup, is an association football league of Saudi Arabia. It was founded in the 1975–1976 season where Al-Nasr was the first champion. It was initially for senior teams, though rules were later changed to only allow players under 23 years. However, after a few years, and a lack of spectator interest, the competition was opened up again to players of all ages.

It changed to under 21s and will count for the youth team and not for the first team. Al-Hilal is the record holder on this competition with the most championships.

List of champions

Performance by club
first team

Performance by club
u23 , u21 team

See also 

 Saudi Arabia Football Federation

External links 
 Saudi Arabia Football Federation
Saudi Arabia - List of Cup Winners, RSSSF.com

Saudi Federation Cup
4
Saudi Arabia